Hook Street is the name of two places in England:

 Hook Street, a village near Berkeley, Gloucestershire
 Hook Street, Wiltshire, a hamlet near Lydiard Tregoze